In photography and optics, a neutral-density filter, or ND filter, is a filter that reduces or modifies the intensity of all wavelengths, or colors, of light equally, giving no changes in hue of color rendition. It can be a colorless (clear) or grey filter, and is denoted by Wratten number 96. The purpose of a standard photographic neutral-density filter is to reduce the amount of light entering the lens. Doing so allows the photographer to select combinations of aperture, exposure time and sensor sensitivity that would otherwise produce overexposed pictures. This is done to achieve effects such as a shallower depth of field or motion blur of a subject in a wider range of situations and atmospheric conditions.

For example, one might wish to photograph a waterfall at a slow shutter speed to create a deliberate motion-blur effect. The photographer might determine that to obtain the desired effect, a shutter speed of ten seconds was needed. On a very bright day, there might be so much light that even at minimal film speed and a minimal aperture, the ten-second shutter speed would let in too much light, and the photo would be overexposed. In this situation, applying an appropriate neutral-density filter is the equivalent of stopping down one or more additional stops, allowing the slower shutter speed and the desired motion-blur effect.

Mechanism
For an ND filter with optical density d, the fraction of the optical power transmitted through the filter can be calculated as

where I is the intensity after the filter, and I0 is the incident intensity.

Uses

The use of an ND filter allows the photographer to use a larger aperture that is at or below the diffraction limit, which varies depending on the size of the sensory medium (film or digital) and for many cameras is between f/8 and f/11, with smaller sensory medium sizes needing larger-sized apertures, and larger ones able to use smaller apertures. ND filters can also be used to reduce the depth of field of an image (by allowing the use of a larger aperture) where otherwise not possible due to a maximal shutter speed limit.

Instead of reducing the aperture to limit light, the photographer can add a ND filter to limit light, and can then set the shutter speed according to the particular motion desired (blur of water movement, for example) and the aperture set as needed (small aperture for maximal sharpness or large aperture for narrow depth of field (subject in focus and background out of focus)). Using a digital camera, the photographer can see the image right away and choose the best ND filter to use for the scene being captured by first knowing the best aperture to use for maximal sharpness desired. The shutter speed would be selected by finding the desired blur from subject movement. The camera would be set up for these in manual mode, and then the overall exposure adjusted darker by adjusting either aperture or shutter speed, noting the number of stops needed to bring the exposure to that which is desired. That offset would then be the amount of stops needed in the ND filter to use for that scene.

Examples of this use include:
 Blurring water motion (e.g. waterfalls, rivers, oceans).
 Reducing depth of field in very bright light (e.g. daylight).
 When using a flash on a camera with a focal-plane shutter, exposure time is limited to the maximal speed (often 1/250th of a second, at best), at which the entire film or sensor is exposed to light at one instant.  Without an ND filter, this can result in the need to use f/8 or higher.
 Using a wider aperture to stay below the diffraction limit.
 Reduce the visibility of moving objects.
 Add motion blur to subjects.
 Extended time exposures

Neutral-density filters are used to control exposure with photographic catadioptric lenses, since the use of a traditional iris diaphragm increases the ratio of the central obstruction found in those systems, leading to poor performance.

ND filters find applications in several high-precision laser experiments because the power of a laser cannot be adjusted without changing other properties of the laser light (e.g. collimation of the beam). Moreover, most lasers have a minimal power setting at which they can be operated. To achieve the desired light attenuation, one or more neutral-density filters can be placed in the path of the beam.

Large telescopes can cause the Moon and planets to become too bright and lose contrast. A neutral-density filter can increase the contrast and cut down the brightness, making these objects easier to view.

Varieties

A graduated ND filter is similar, except that the intensity varies across the surface of the filter. This is useful when one region of the image is bright and the rest is not, as in a picture of a sunset.

The transition area, or edge, is available in different variations (soft, hard, attenuator). The most common is a soft edge and provides a smooth transition from the ND side and the clear side. Hard-edge filters have a sharp transition from ND to clear, and the attenuator edge changes gradually over most of the filter, so the transition is less noticeable.

Another type of ND filter configuration is the ND-filter wheel. It consists of two perforated glass disks that have progressively denser coating applied around the perforation on the face of each disk. When the two disks are counter-rotated in front of each other, they gradually and evenly go from 100% transmission to 0% transmission. These are used on catadioptric telescopes mentioned above and in any system that is required to work at 100% of its aperture (usually because the system is required to work at its maximal angular resolution).

In practice, ND filters are not perfect, as they do not reduce the intensity of all wavelengths equally. This can sometimes create color casts in recorded images, particularly with inexpensive filters. More significantly, most ND filters are only specified over the visible region of the spectrum and do not proportionally block all wavelengths of ultraviolet or infrared radiation. This can be dangerous if using ND filters to view sources (such as the Sun or white-hot metal or glass), which emit intense invisible radiation, since the eye may be damaged even though the source does not look bright when viewed through the filter. Special filters must be used if such sources are to be safely viewed.

An inexpensive, homemade alternative to professional ND filters can be made from a piece of welder's glass.  Depending on the rating of the welder's glass, this can have the effect of a 10-stop filter.

Variable neutral-density filter 

The main disadvantage of neutral-density filters is that different situations might require a range of different filters. This can become an expensive proposition, especially if using screw filters with different lens filter sizes, which would require carrying a set for each diameter of lens carried (although inexpensive step-up rings can eliminate this requirement). To counter this problem, some manufacturers have created variable ND filters. These can work by placing two polarizing filters together, at least one of which can rotate. The rear polarizing filter cuts out light in one plane.  As the front element is rotated, it cuts out an increasing amount of the remaining light, the closer the front filters comes to being perpendicular to the rear filter. By using this technique, the amount of light reaching the sensor can be varied with almost infinite control.

The advantage of this approach is reduced bulk and expenses, but one drawback is a loss of image quality caused by both using two elements together and by combining two polarizing filters.

Extreme ND filters 

To create ethereal looking landscapes and seascapes with extremely blurred water or other motion, the use of multiple stacked ND filters might be required. This has, as in the case of variable NDs, the effect of reducing image quality. To counter this, some manufacturers have produced high-quality extreme ND filters. Typically these are rated at a 10-stop reduction, allowing very slow shutter speeds even in relatively bright conditions.

Ratings
In photography, ND filters are quantified by their optical density or equivalently their f-stop reduction. In microscopy, the transmittance value is sometimes used. In astronomy, the fractional transmittance is sometimes used (eclipses).

 Note: Hoya, B+W, Cokin use code ND2 or ND2x, etc.; Lee, Tiffen use code 0.3ND, etc.; Leica uses code 1×, 4×, 8×, etc.
 Note: ND 3.8 is the correct value for solar CCD exposure without risk of electronic damage.
 Note: ND 5.0 is the minimum for direct eye solar observation without damage of retina. A further check must be performed for the particular filter used, checking on the spectrogram that also UV and IR are mitigated with the same value.

See also
 Graduated neutral-density filter

References

External links

Neutral Density Filter Calculation Chart
Neutral Density Filters and Graduated ND Filters
What do ND filters do, and what do they NOT do?
Neutral Density Filters: What are they & when to use them ?
Neutral Density Filter FAQ at Digital Grin Photography Forum

Optical filters